Ellis Larkins at Maybeck: Maybeck Recital Hall Series Volume Twenty-Two is an album of solo performances by jazz pianist Ellis Larkins.

Music and recording
The album was recorded at the Maybeck Recital Hall in Berkeley, California in March 1992. The material, chosen by Larkins, is "a rarefied selection of songs [...] as well as some Ellington and a tune of his own".

Release and reception

The AllMusic review described Larkins as "A tasteful and subtle player whose chord voicings are unique". The Penguin Guide to Jazz wrote that Larkins's "proper technique, off-kilter humour and very slow, stately swing make up a kind of jazz that has almost vanished".

Track listing
"Introductory Announcement"
"How'dja Like to Love Me?"
"Perfume and Rain"
"Oh, Lady Be Good"
"I Don't Want to Cry Anymore"
"Blue Skies"
"No More/God Bless the Child"
"I Let a Song Go Out of My Heart"
"Spring Will Be a Little Late This Year"
"Leave Me Alone"
"Things Ain't What They Used to Be"
"When a Woman Loves a Man/I'm Through with Love"

Personnel
Ellis Larkins – piano

References

Albums recorded at the Maybeck Recital Hall
Solo piano jazz albums